Maureen Kelley is the Madeline Brill Nelson Chair in Ethics Education and Professor of Medicine at Oregon Health & Science University, Portland. Previous to this role she was Professor of Bioethics at the Nuffield Department of Population Health, University of Oxford, England. She has previously served on the World Health Organization's COVID-19 research ethics review committee.

Education 
Kelley received her PhD in philosophy with a specialization in bioethics from Rice University, Houston, Texas. She also holds an MA from the University of North Carolina at Charlotte.

Career and research 
Prior to joining the University of Oxford in 2016 Kelley was a faculty member at the Treuman Katz Center for Pediatric Bioethics, Seattle Children's Hospital, Seattle, Washington, and the Department of Pediatrics at the University of Washington School of Medicine. She has also held affiliate faculty membership at Houston Methodist Hospital in Texas as well as appointments at Baylor College of Medicine and the University of Alabama's Sparkman Center for Global Health. Kelley moved to the University of Oxford in 2016 as a senior member of the Ethox Centre, a research group working on health research ethics.

Kelley is a safeguarding expert for the UK Collaborative on Development Research. She is also a member of the advisory board for the European Union Border Care project, a comparative study of the politics of maternity care among undocumented migrants on the EU’s peripheries, funded by the European Research Council. Kelley was a member of the World Health Organization's COVID-19 research ethics review committee in 2020, reviewing COVID-19 research projects involving human participants supported either financially or technically by WHO.

Kelley was appointed as the Madeline Brill Nelson Chair in Ethics Education at Oregon Health & Science University in early 2022, she became the Senior Associate Director within OHSU's Center for Ethics in Health Care.

See also 
Nuffield Department of Population Health

References

External links 
 OHSU Profile: Maureen Kelley

Academics of the University of Oxford
Rice University alumni
Living people
Public health researchers
Bioethicists
Women's health
Year of birth missing (living people)